Barclay is a town in Lincoln County, Nevada, United States. Originally a Mormon settlement in the late 1860s, it has few residents and appears on several ghost town lists. The Barclay post office closed in 1910.   Main sites in the town include an old Mormon cemetery, and an abandoned Post Office, the latter being one of the few remaining buildings in the town.

The National Mustang Association owns a ranch in the area that serves as a sanctuary for wild horses.

References

Unincorporated communities in Lincoln County, Nevada
Unincorporated communities in Nevada